Secondino Tranquilli (1 May 1900 – 22 August 1978), known by the pseudonym Ignazio Silone, was an Italian political leader, novelist, and short-story writer, world-famous during World War II for his powerful anti-fascist novels. He was nominated for the Nobel Prize for Literature ten times.

Early life
Silone was born in a rural family, in the town of Pescina in the Abruzzo region. His father Paolo Tranquilli died in 1911, and in the 1915 Avezzano earthquake he lost many of his family members, including his mother, Marianna Delli Quadri. He left his hometown and finished high school. In 1917, Silone joined the Young Socialists group of the Italian Socialist Party (PSI), rising to be their leader.

He was a founding member of the breakaway Communist Party of Italy (PCd'I) in 1921 and became one of its covert leaders during the Fascist regime. Ignazio's brother Romolo Tranquilli was arrested in 1928 for being a member of the PCd'I and died in prison in 1931 as a result of the severe beatings he received.

Opposition to Stalinism, return to the PSI and breakaway socialist activity

Silone left Italy in 1927 on a mission to the Soviet Union and settled in Switzerland in 1930. While there, he declared his opposition to Joseph Stalin and the leadership of Comintern; consequently, he was expelled from the PCd'I and returned to the PSI. He suffered from tuberculosis and severe clinical depression and spent nearly a year in Swiss clinics; in Switzerland, Aline Valangin helped and played host to him and other migrants. As he recovered, Silone began writing his first novel, Fontamara, published in German translation in 1933. The English edition, first published by Penguin Books in September 1934, went through frequent reprintings during the 1930s, with the events of the Spanish Civil War and the escalation towards the outbreak of World War II increasing attention for its subject material.

In the course of World War II, Silone became the leader of a clandestine socialist organization operating from Switzerland to support resistance groups in Nazi Germany-occupied Northern Italy. He also became an Office of Strategic Services (OSS) agent under the pseudonym of Len. The United States Army printed unauthorized versions of Fontamara and Bread and Wine and distributed them to the Italians during the liberation of Italy after 1943. These two books together with The Seed Beneath the Snow form the Abruzzo Trilogy. Silone returned to Italy only in 1944, and two years later he was elected as a PSI deputy. 

In 1948 Silone was a founder of the breakaway Union of Socialists (Unione dei Socialisti; UdS), succeeding Ivan Matteo Lombardo as the party's leader in June 1949. In December of that year the UdS was dissolved, and its members (including Silone) joined the Unitary Socialist Party (Partito Socialista Unitario; PSU). Two years later, in 1951, the PSU merged with Giuseppe Saragat's Italian Socialist Workers' Party (Partito Socialista dei Lavoratori Italiani; PSLI) to form the Italian Democratic Socialist Party (Partito Socialista Democratico Italiano; PSDI). Saragat encouraged Silone to stand for the Senate on the PSDI list in the 1953 Italian general election, but the experience was a failure, and from then on he spurned any active participation in Italian politics.

Later writing and awards
Following his contribution to the anti-communist anthology The God That Failed (1949), Silone joined the Congress of Cultural Freedom and edited Tempo Presente together with Nicola Chiaromonte. In 1967, with the discovery that the journal received secret funds from the United States Central Intelligence Agency, Silone resigned and devoted all his energies to writing novels and autobiographical essays.

In 1969, he was awarded the Jerusalem Prize, which goes to writers who deal with the theme of individual freedom and society. In 1971, he was awarded the prestigious Prix mondial Cino Del Duca.

Controversy

In the 1990s, Italian historians Dario Biocca and Mauro Canali found documents that implied that Silone had acted as an informant for the Fascist police from 1919 until 1930. It is believed that the reason he broke from the Fascist police is that they tortured his brother. The two historians published the results of their research in a work titled L'informatore. Silone, i comunisti e la polizia.

A 2005 biography by Biocca also includes documents showing Silone's involvement with American intelligence (the OSS) during and after World War II, suggesting that Silone's political stands (as well as extensive literary work) should be reconsidered in light of a more complex personality and political engagements.

Personal life
Ignazio Silone was married to Darina Laracy (1917–2003), an Irish student of Italian literature and journalist. He died in Geneva, Switzerland in 1978.

Works

Novels 
 Fontamara (1930) (Fontamara, transl. Michael Wharf (1934); Gwenda David and Eric Mosbacher (1938); Harvey Fergusson II (1960)) 
 Un viaggio a Parigi (1934), (Mr. Aristotle, transl. Samuel Putnam (1935)) (short stories)
 Pane e vino (1936) (Bread and Wine, transl. Gwenda David and Eric Mosbacher (1936))
 Il seme sotto la neve (1941) (The Seed Beneath the Snow, transl. Frances Frenaye (1942))
 Una manciata di more (1952) (A Handful of Blackberries, transl. Darina Silone (1953))
 Pane e vino (revised version, 1955) (Bread and Wine, transl. Harvey Fergusson II (1962)) 
 Il segreto di Luca (1956) (The Secret of Luca, transl. Darina Silone (1958))
 La volpe e le camelie (1960) (The Fox and the Camelias, transl. Eric Mosbacher (1961))
 Severina (1981), completed after his death by Darina Silone
 The Abruzzo Trilogy: Fontamara, Bread and Wine, The Seed Beneath the Snow, transl. Eric Mosbacher, revised by Darina Silone (2000)

Essays 
 Il Fascismo. Origini e sviluppo (1934)
 La scuola dei dittatori (1938) (The School for Dictators, transl. Gwenda David and Eric Mosbacher (1939))  
 Memoriale dal carcere svizzero, (1942) (Memoir from a Swiss Prison, transl. Stanislao G. Pugliese (2006))
 The God that Failed (contribution) (1949)
 Uscita Di Sicurezza (1965) (Emergency Exit, transl. Harvey Fergusson II (1968))
 L'Avvenire dei Lavoratori (1945)
 A Conversation in Paris (1955), in The Anchor Review, Number One of a Series, Garden City, New York: Doubleday Anchor Books.
 Mazzini, introductory essay, transl. Dr. Arthur Livingstone, to The Living Thoughts of Mazzini Presented by Ignazio Silone (1939)
Three of Silone's poems were included by Hanns Eisler in his Deutsche Sinfonie, along with poetry by Bertolt Brecht.

Theater 
 Ed egli si nascose (1944) (And He Hid Himself: A Play in Four Acts, transl. Darina Silone (1946))
 L'avventura di un povero cristiano (1968) (The Story of a Humble Christian, transl. William Weaver (1970))

Further reading
 Iris Origo. A Need to Testify: Portraits of Lauro de Bosis, Ruth Draper, Gaetano Salvemini, Ignazio Silone and an essay on Biography, Harcourt Brace Jovanovich (1984)
 Maria Nicolai Paynter. Ignazio Silone: Beyond the Tragic Vision, University of Toronto Press (2000)

Cinematic versions
A version of Fontamara, directed by Carlo Lizzani and starring Michele Placido, was released in 1977.

References

Resources
 Giuseppe Leone, Ignazio Silone, scrittore dell'intelligenza, Firenze Atheneum, Firenze, 1996, 
 Dario Biocca – Mauro Canali. L'informatore: Silone, i comunisti e la polizia, Luni Editrice, Milan, Trento, 2000
 Giuseppe Tamburrano. Processo a Silone, La disavventura di un povero cristiano, Lacaita Editore, Rome, 2001
 Maria Moscardelli, La Coperta Abruzzese. Il filo della vita di Ignazio Silone, Ed. Aracne, Rome, 2004.
 Mauro Canali. Le spie del regime, Il Mulino, Bologna, 2004
 Dario Biocca. Silone. La doppia vita di un italiano, Rizzoli, Milan 2005.
 Mimmo Franzinelli, Silone in the 'thirties'''. www.mimmofranzinelli.it/tool/home.php?s=0,1,55,57,63, n.d.
 Elizabeth Leake. The Reinvention of Ignazio Silone, University of Toronto Press Toronto, 2003
 Giuseppe Leone, Silone e Machiavelli: una scuola... che non crea prìncipi, Prefazione di Vittoriano Esposito, Centro Studi Ignazio Silone, Pescina, 2003.
 Giuseppe Leone, [rec. al vol. di] Maria Moscardelli, "La coperta abruzzese – Il filo della vita di Ignazio Silone", in "Marsica Domani", Avezzano, 31 ottobre 2005, pag. 9.
 Giuseppe Leone, Nulla di vero nel Silone di Biocca, su Marsica Domani, Avezzano, 2005.
 
 Giuseppe Leone, [rec. al vol. di] Valeria Giannantonio, "La scrittura oltre la vita ( Studi su Ignazio Silone)", su "Quaderni siloniani", 1-2/2005.
 Michael P. McDonald, Il caso Silone (in English), National Interest, 2001.
 Maria Moscardelli, Silone Reinvented, www.amici-silone.net/silone_reinvented.htm, 2005. 
 Stanislao G. Pugliese. Bitter Spring: A Life of Ignazio Silone, Farrar, Straus and Giroux, New York, 2009.
 Giuseppe Leone e Roberto Zambonini, "Puccini e le "more" di Silone: viaggio poetico-musicale fra "soavi fanciulle" e coraggiose eroine", Malgrate (Lc), 27 agosto 2009.
 Giuseppe Leone, "L'ennesimo bis del secondo "caso" Silone – Andrea Paganini e il suo "Ignazio Silone, l'uomo che si è salvato", su Pomezia-Notizie, Roma, Luglio 2010, pp. 10–11.
 Giuseppe Leone, Il "fenicottero" Silone nella revisione di Renzo Paris, Pomezia-Notizie, February 2015, pp. 10–11.
 Ignazio Silone, Il seme sotto la neve, Edizione critica a cura di Alessandro La Monica, Milan and Florence, Mondadori Education-Le Monnier University, 2015.
 Giuseppe Leone, "La scuola dei dittatori ovvero un Machiavelli di meno", in: AA.VV., "Atti del Convegno Internazionale di Studi Caen (7 February 2019) Pescina (23-24 August 2019), "Ignazio Silone o la Logica della privazione", a cura di Mario Cimini e Brigitte Poitrenaud Lamesi, Rocco Carabba Editore, Lanciano, 2020, pp. 241–253.
Stefano Mercanti, Colonial Narrative and Indigenous Consciousness in Raja Rao's Kanthapura and Ignazio Silone's Fontamara In Voice and Memory. Indigenous Imagination and Expression, G. Devy, G. V. Davis & K. K. Chakravarty (eds). Hyderabad: Orient Blackswan, pp. 209-225, .

External links

1900 births
1978 deaths
People from Pescina
Italian male journalists
Italian Socialist Party politicians
Italian Communist Party politicians
20th-century Italian politicians
Italian anti-communists
People of the Office of Strategic Services
Jerusalem Prize recipients
20th-century Italian novelists
20th-century male writers
Premio Campiello winners
Anti-Stalinist left
20th-century Italian journalists
Exiled Italian politicians
Italian magazine editors